Desinec may refer to:

Desinec, Croatia, is a group of two villages northeast of Jastrebarsko in central Croatia
Desinec, Slovenia, a settlement in the Črnomelj municipality in southeastern Slovenia